Yamanashi can refer to:

 Yamanashi Prefecture, a Japanese prefecture with 888,170 people 
 Yamanashi, Yamanashi, a Japanese city with 39,631 people
 Joseph Yamanashi, a recurring character on MADtv played by Bobby Lee
 Yamanashi, Japanese for no "climax" (see yaoi)
 Yamanashi Hanzō (1864–1944), general in the Imperial Japanese Army, Minister of War and Governor-General of Korea from 1927 to 1929